Altata is a small town in Navolato Municipality connected to the Pacific Ocean, located about 45 miles west of Culiacán, Sinaloa in Mexico by Freeway 30. It has a very nice beach and much wildlife: octopus, toninas, starfish, jellyfish, shark, birds, and many fish species. El Tambor and Nuevo Altata are nearby beaches. Altata currently has many residents who fish for a living. People from Culiacán usually go there to ride their dirt bikes and ATVs on the surrounding dirt roads, dunes and beaches.

Altata is a beautiful little town that used to have a nice beach until merchants and vendors established permanent stands to sell tacos, seafood, fruits and plenty of alcohol. These stands form two parallel rows facing each other, one occupying the old beach and the other, occupies portions of the water, the narrow space between them is used as a road.

Behind the beach side stands, there are Restaurants specializing on seafood cocktails and fried fish which are very popular with families from the vicinity.

A recent private development called Nuevo Altata is taking shape just north from there. It has beautiful beaches and docks, but they are not for public use or access.

External links
 Official web site

Populated places in Sinaloa